Dame Elizabeth Susan Cunliffe-Lister, DCVO (née Whitelaw; born 1944), commonly known by her middle name Susan, served as the Lord Lieutenant of the East Riding of Yorkshire from 2005 until her retirement in 2019.

Susan Cunliffe-Lister is the former President of the Yorkshire Agricultural Society and founder of the Great Yorkshire Show and the Sheep Fair in Masham. She is currently the Head Gardener at Swinton Estate, owned by her son Mark Cunliffe-Lister, 4th Earl of Swinton.

She is a gardener and managed the Burton Agnes Hall from 1989 until 2008 and also the Swinton Estate where she still manages and tends to the gardens to the present day. She was appointed a Deputy Lieutenant for the East Riding of Yorkshire in 1996, served as High Sheriff of the Riding in the 2001–02 year, and became its Lord Lieutenant in 2005.

Susan has written a book 'Days of Yore: A History of Masham'. The book can be bought at the Masham Community Office, or Swinton Estate reception.

In the 2019 New Year Honours, Cunliffe-Lister was appointed a Dame Commander of the Royal Victorian Order by Queen Elizabeth II in recognition of her many years of service as the Lord Lieutenant of the East Riding of Yorkshire.

References 

Living people
1944 births
Daughters of viscounts
Dames Commander of the Royal Victorian Order
Lord-Lieutenants of the East Riding of Yorkshire